Julieanne Claire Gilbert (born 6 May 1962) is an Australian politician currently serving as the Assistant Minister for Health and Regional Health Infrastructure of Queensland.  She has been the Labor member for Mackay in the Queensland Legislative Assembly since 2015.

See also
Second Palaszczuk Ministry
Third Palaszczuk Ministry

References

1962 births
Living people
Members of the Queensland Legislative Assembly
Australian Labor Party members of the Parliament of Queensland
21st-century Australian politicians
Women members of the Queensland Legislative Assembly
21st-century Australian women politicians